Stefano Mancuso (born 9 May 1965) is an Italian botanist,  professor of the Agriculture, Food, Environment and Forestry department at his alma mater, the University of Florence. He  is the director of the International Laboratory of Plant Neurobiology, steering committee member of the Society of Plant Signaling and Behavior, editor-in-chief of the Plant Signaling & Behavior journal and a member of the Accademia dei Georgofili.

Biography 
Mancuso developed an interest in the research of plants during his university studies. Since 2001, he has been a professor at the University of Florence, and in 2005 he founded the International Laboratory of Plant Neurobiology, designed to study physiology, behavior, molecular biology, intelligence, and other fields of plant science.

Scientific research

Inspiration and predecessors 
Plant neurobiology deals with the memory research (including transgenerational and epigenetic learning) of experience (for example, mimosa pudica, which responds to touch by folding its leaves), communication and social life of the plants.

According to  Mancuso, since the beginning of the 1990s, some scientists began to recognize that plants have not only the ability to communicate with each other, but also their own form of intelligence.

Root system of plants 
Mancuso studied the abilities of plants and their root system (in particular, the tops of the roots, which are very sensitive to various types of stimuli, such as pressure, temperature, certain sounds, humidity, and damage).  According to an article published in 2004 by a group of botanists (which included Mancuso), the areas of the root apices interact with each other, forming a structure whose functions they proposed to be similar to the functions of an animal's brain.

Plant perception 
Mancuso concluded that in the course of evolution, plants had to work out solutions to the problems inherent in organisms attached to a substrate. Although plants have neither nerves nor a brain, they have a social life and, therefore, analogs of the sensory organs, though very different from those in animals. He considers the key to understanding this can be found in some cells (gametes and bacteria), corals, sponges, and in the behavior of organisms such as placozoa. In 2012, Mancuso and his colleagues found that plants have receptors that make their roots sensitive to sound and the direction of its distribution. Other biologists four years prior claimed that trees in conditions of acute water shortage can emit sounds which can be more than just passive signs of cavitation.

Phytoplankton and terrestrial plants have certain abilities for the perception of light. Mancuso and his colleagues showed that in the laboratory arabidopsis the root apices are very sensitive to light (a few seconds of illumination are enough to cause an immediate and strong reaction of the molecules of the ROS). These phenomena complemented earlier observations and studies of living roots made using confocal microscopy.

His book “Plant revolution: le piante hanno già inventato il nostro futuro”, describes his view of how plants have found and tested “brilliant” solutions to the various problems that humanity faces today for hundreds of millions of years. Plants, partly due to symbiosis with bacteria and fungi, “invented” well-optimized and stable methods of colonizing the earth's surface and then the lower atmosphere. Plants also created one of the most important carbon sinks on our planet, and launched the production of clean energy from starch, sucrose, sclerenchyma and complex biomolecules through photosynthetic chlorophyll, biodegradability according to the principles of a circular economy.

Plants and animals 
Mancuso notes that vascular plants have an analogue of the circulatory system, consisting of several organs (in particular reproductive organs), but that unlike highly organized animals, plants have receptors distributed throughout the body, while animals have receptors concentrated in specific organs such as eyes, ears, skin, tongue. The reproductive organs of plants are diverse in principle of their functioning, while in animals they are more unified. According to Mancuso, this suggests that the plants "smell", "listen", "communicate" (between individuals of the same species, and sometimes with other species) and "learn" (through a certain form of memory, including the memory of their immune system), using their entire modular organism (which allows plants to resist both predatory and herbivorous animals better). Mancuso often refers to lima bean as an example, which, when attacked by red spider mite (lat. tetranychus urticae), releases a complex of molecules into the air that can attract phytoseiulus persimilis, carnivorous mites that are ready to absorb colonies of their spider mates. Mancuso and his colleagues emphasized the role of auxins, which function as neurotransmitters, similar to those found in animals.

Now we also know that plants are able to synthesize molecules that play a role similar to animal neurons, in particular synaptotagmins and monosodium glutamate. Plants can carry out the biosynthesis of molecules that are supposed to be homologous to molecules that perform important functions in animals (for example, molecules that activate immunophilins that perform immune and hormonal functions in animals, in particular, signaling of steroid and neurological hormones). Cytology confirms the existence of plant cells behaving as synapses, in which auxins appear to play the role of neurotransmitters (given the specifics of plants). In 2005, Mancuso, together with several biochemists, developed a “non-invasive” microelectrode based on carbon nanotube technology for measuring and fixing the flow of information that can circulate in plants.

Plant intelligence 
Mancuso notes that for a very long time, intelligence was mistakenly considered by many people to be “what distinguishes us from other living beings,” but if we consider intelligence as the ability to solve and overcome problems, we have to recognize that plants possess it, and it is intelligence that allows plants to develop and respond to most of the problems that they encounter throughout their ontogenesis.

Thus, plants adapt to life in almost all sufficiently lit terrestrial and aquatic environments, encountering both herbivores and predatory insects and animals. Although plants do not have a specific organ comparable to the brain, they use the equivalent of the so-called "Diffuse brain" (it. "Cervello diffuso"). Some plants, for example, are capable of secreting substances that attract insects and animals that plants use for their own needs. Chemicals synthesized by plants often have a very complex effect on the behavior of animals and insects (an example is the mutually beneficial relationship of myrmecophytes and ants, in particular the phenomenon of the devil's garden in Amazonian forests).

Mancuso and his colleagues recall that at the end of his life, when Charles Darwin became more interested in plants, in a book called "The Power of Movement in Plants", Darwin wrote:

Professional activities 
In 2010, Mancuso gave a lecture in Oxford on the movement of roots in the soil: how they look for water, nutrients and capture new spaces. Mancuso was also an invited speaker at the TED Global conference in the same year.

In 2012, in the Plantoid project, he took part in the creation of a "bio-inspired" robot that imitated certain natural properties of the roots, and could, for example, explore an area that is difficult to access or contaminated as a result of a nuclear accident or the use of bacteriological weapons. The Plantoid project is still developing for the European Commission by consortium of the scientists including Mancuso.

In 2013, he published the book Plant Intelligence (italian: L’intelligenza delle piante), co-authored with Alessandra Viola.

In 2014, at the University of Florence, Mancuso created a startup specializing in plant biomimetics and an autonomous floating greenhouse, which was offered for mass production to the Chilean government in 2016.

In 2017, he published The Revolutionary Genius of Plants: A New Understanding of Plant Intelligence and Behavior. The English translation of the book was written by Vanessa Di Stefano.

Philosophical views 
Mancuso conducts research in the field of so-called plant neurobiology, a concept that is still the subject of controversy in the scientific community.

According to his view, academicians were initially highly skeptical of even a simple concept like “plant behavior” or "plant learning", and until 2005 there was an unspoken ban on a discussion of “plant behavior” in academic circles, but subsequent discoveries have led to the creation of university departments within this research area, as well as the writing of numerous articles and scientific papers. Around the same time, discussion about “bio-inspired plantoid robots” began. These machines could, for example, use a light mechanical system similar to plant roots to restore washed-out or contaminated soils. Some scientists still refuse to talk about the intelligence of plants and even about their "consciousness", as this leads to new philosophical questions, for example: if plants perceive wounds or aggression, and then respond to them, carrying out various biochemical processes, is it possible to draw analogies with pain in animals here? In 2008, a petition signed by thirty-six European and North American biologists urged to avoid using the term “plant neuroscience” in scientific usage. On the other hand, the hypothesis of a common intelligence in plants seems to immediately attract the attention of the general public.

In his view, cultural and even theoretical prerequisites still hinder the quantitative and qualitative assessment (through experiments in particular) of the cognitive abilities of plants, because the scientific methodology for assessing intelligence itself was originally built to study humans and animals (artificial intelligence studies have been added to this relatively recently).

Awards 
 :it:Premio Nazionale di Divulgazione - National Award for Scientific Dissemination, 2013
 Award of the Austrian Ministry of Research and Economy for the Book of the Year, 2016  
 :it:Premio letterario Galileo per la divulgazione scientifica — “Plant revolution: le piante hanno già inventato il nostro futuro” book, May 21, 2018 
 Environment award on the Tignano festival, July 18, 2019

Scientific work

Publications 
 Baluška, F., Volkmann, D., Hlavacka, A., Mancuso, S., & Barlow, P. W. (2006). Neurobiological view of plants and their body plan. In Communication in plants (pp. 19–35). Springer, Berlin, Heidelberg.
 Brenner, E. D., Stahlberg, R., Mancuso, S., Vivanco, J., Baluška, F., & Van Volkenburgh, E. (2006). Plant neurobiology: an integrated view of plant signaling. Trends in plant science, 11(8), 413—419.
 Gagliano, M., Mancuso, S., & Robert, D. (2012). Towards understanding plant bioacoustics. Trends in plant science, 17(6), 323—325.
 Gagliano M, Renton M, Duvdevani N, Timmins M & Mancuso S (2012) Out of sight but not out of mind: alternative means of communication in plants. PLoS One, 7(5), e37382.
 Mancuso, S. (Ed.). (2011). Measuring roots: an updated approach. Springer Science & Business Media.
 Mancuso, S., & Viola, A. (2015). Brilliant green: The surprising history and science of plant intelligence. Island Press.
 Santelia, D., Vincenzetti, V., Azzarello, E., Bovet, L., Fukao, Y., Düchtig, P., … & Geisler, M. (2005). MDR‐like ABC transporter AtPGP4 is involved in auxin‐mediated lateral root and root hair development. FEBS letters, 579(24), 5399-5406.
 Schapire, A. L., Voigt, B., Jasik, J., Rosado, A., Lopez-Cobollo, R., Menzel, D., … & Botella, M. A. (2008) Arabidopsis synaptotagmin 1 is required for the maintenance of plasma membrane integrity and cell viability. The Plant Cell, 20(12), 3374-3388.

Essay 
 La nazione delle piante, Laterza, 2019
 L’incredibile viaggio delle piante, Laterza, 2018
 Plant revolution, Giunti editore, 2017
 Botanica. Viaggio nell’universo vegetale, Aboca edizioni, 2017
 Verde brillante, sensibilità e intelligenza del mondo vegetale, con Alessandra Viola, Giunti editore, 2015
 Biodiversi, con Carlo Petrini, Slow Foof, 2015
 Uomini che amano le piante, Giunti editore, 2014

See also 
 Jellyfish Barge

References

External links 
Stefano Mancuso at TED
Official website of the Plantoid project
The secret life of plants: how they memorise, communicate, problem solve and socialise - The Guardian article by Amy Fleming (April 5, 2020)
Stefano Mancuso: Plant intelligence is real - The BBC article (November 20, 2015)
Are plants intelligent? New book says yes - The Guardian article by Jeremy Hance (August 4, 2015)
The Intelligent Plant. Scientists debate a new way of understanding flora  - The New Yorker article by Michael Pollan (December 16, 2013) 
Plant neurobiology. From stimulus perception to adaptive behavior of plants, via integrated chemical and electrical signaling - The Plant Signaling & Behavior journal article by Stefano Mancuso and František Baluška, indexed by The National Center for Biotechnology Information (June 1, 2009)
Smarty Plants: Inside the World's Only Plant-Intelligence Lab - The Wired article by Nicole Martinelli (October 30, 2007)

1965 births
Living people
University of Florence alumni
Academic staff of the University of Florence
21st-century Italian botanists
People from Catanzaro
20th-century Italian botanists